In algebra, a chiral Lie algebra is a D-module on a curve with a certain structure of Lie algebra. It is related to an -algebra via the Riemann–Hilbert correspondence.

See also 
Chiral algebra
Chiral homology

References 

Lie algebras